The Shadow is a 1994 pinball game designed by Brian Eddy and released by Midway (under the Bally label). It is based on the 1994 movie of the same name.

Description
This game featured new speech by Penelope Ann Miller (Margo Lane), John Lone (Shiwan Khan), and Tim Curry (Farley Claymore) (reprising their respective roles), as well as speech from the movie. The Shadow's speech for this game was provided by Williams/Midway voice actor, Tim Kitzrow.
 
The game's noted features include player-controlled ball diverters on the left and right ramps, a magnetic ball lock (which freezes the ball and pulls the ball inside the ball lock for Shadow Multiball), and a Breakout-style upper playfield, called "The Battlefield".

Gameplay
The goal is to complete the following tasks to engage in a Final Battle with Shiwan Khan, the game's antagonist:
Complete Scenes: Complete the following scenes:
Punish The Guilty
Farley Claymore
Duel Of Wills (video mode)
The Beryllium Sphere
Escape Underwater Doom
Discover Hotel Monolith
Conquer Battle Field: 
Shadow Multiball
Khan Multiball

References

External links
 
The Shadow on Pinside.com
The Shadow pinball promo video
Recent Auction Results for The Shadow

The Shadow
1994 pinball machines
Bally pinball machines
Pinball machines based on films